Bernd Englmeier (born 4 February 1945) is a German boxer. He competed in the men's light flyweight event at the 1968 Summer Olympics.

References

External links
 

1945 births
Living people
German male boxers
Olympic boxers of East Germany
Boxers at the 1968 Summer Olympics
People from Zwickau
Light-flyweight boxers
Sportspeople from Saxony
20th-century German people